Mayilattam is a 2004 Malayalam-language action comedy film directed by V. M. Vinu. It stars Jayaram in a dual roles along with Rambha, Indraja, and Jagathy Sreekumar in the pivotal roles. The film was a commercial success at the box office. It was an Onam release of 2004.

Plot
The life of a normal villager Devan (Jayaram) changes when he becomes the single witness of a murder committed by a local goon (Riyaz Khan). Upon this, he's forced to flee from the village as he accidentally harms the goon as a part of self defense when the goon came at night to finish him. He, along with his brother-in-law (Jagathy Sreekumar), escapes to Singanallur in Tamil Nadu and there he meets his look alike Pazhani. As per his brother-in-law's instruction, he stays back at Singanallur and sends Pazhani with his brother-in-law. As soon as he reaches Singanallur,  he starts to face problems there, being unknown to the villagers that he's not Pazhani.

Cast 
 Jayaram in a dual role as Devan and Pazhani 
 Jagathy Sreekumar as Dasan, Devan's friend
 Sai Kumar as  Thevar
 Rambha as Mythili
 Indraja as Meenakshi
 Oduvil Unnikrishnan as Kannan Mash
 Riyaz Khan as Ripper
 Bindu Panicker as Bindu
 Maniyanpilla Raju as	Swaminathan
 Augustine as Murukan
 Ponnamma Babu as Ponnamma Dasan's wife
 Vijayaraghavan as Police Officer
 Zeenath as Mythili's mother	
 Poornima Anand	
 Bindu Ramakrishnan
 Sadiq
 Ambika Mohan as Meenakshi
 Gopika Anil as Young Mythili

Soundtrack
Music: M. Jayachandran. Lyrics: Gireesh Puthenchery
 "Kaattaadi Kiliye Vaa" - K. S. Chitra, V. M. Ajith
 "Maamazhayile" (F) - Sujatha Mohan
 "Maamzhayile" (M) - Madhu Balakrishnan
 "Maattupetti Koyilile" - Afsal, Chitra Iyer
 "Muthu Maniye Mutham Vechuko" - M. G. Sreekumar, Sujatha Mohan
 "Thakkida Tharikida" (Kacha Ketti Thaada) - M. G. Sreekumar, Jayaram

References

External links 
 

2004 films
2000s Malayalam-language films
Indian action comedy films
Films shot in Coimbatore
Films directed by V. M. Vinu
Films scored by M. Jayachandran